Pityriasis lichenoides chronica is an uncommon, idiopathic, acquired dermatosis, characterized by evolving groups of erythematous, scaly papules that may persist for months.

Symptoms and signs

Although other forms of the disease occur at younger ages, some individuals start having long term  symptoms at thirty years of age. This disease also affects adolescents and young adults. This also affects the immune system which therefore results in rashes. The symptoms rarely affect the face or scalp, but occurs at other sites of the body. The duration may last for months or even several years. For instance, new crops of lesions appear every few weeks.

Causes 
Pityriasis lichenoides chronica is probably caused by a hypersensitivity reaction to infectious agents such as the Epstein–Barr virus. Other infectious agents include the adenovirus and Parvovirus B19.

Treatment 

There is no standard treatment for pityriasis lichenoides chronica. Treatments may include ultraviolet phototherapy, sun exposure, oral antibiotics, and corticosteroid creams and ointments to treat rash and itching. One study identified the enzyme bromelain as an effective therapeutic option for pityriasis lichenoides chronica.

See also 
 Cutaneous T-cell lymphoma
 Parapsoriasis
 Pityriasis lichenoides
 List of cutaneous conditions

References

External links 
 

Immune system disorders
Lymphoid-related cutaneous conditions